Veyar or Viyar or Viar or Vir may refer to:
 Veyar, Hamadan
 Vir, Markazi
 Viyar, Zanjan